Lewis Robert Egerton Montrose (born 17 November 1988) is an English professional footballer who plays as a central midfielder. He last played for  club Kidderminster Harriers. He has played in the English Football League for Cheltenham Town, Chesterfield, Wycombe Wanderers, Gillingham, Oxford United and York City.

Career
Montrose was born in Manchester, Greater Manchester. He started his career with Manchester City's youth system before joining Wigan Athletic in their youth system. He made his Wigan Athletic debut, as a substitute, in a 2–0 League Cup defeat against Crewe Alexandra on 19 September 2006. He signed a professional contract with Wigan on 5 July 2007.

On 27 March 2008, he was loaned out to League Two club Rochdale, although injury ended his spell at the club before he made a single competitive appearance.

On 24 September 2008, Montrose was loaned out to League One club Cheltenham Town on a one-month deal. Montrose scored his first goal for Cheltenham in their first round FA Cup replay victory away to Oldham Athletic on 18 November 2008. Only a couple of months later, on 6 January 2009, Montrose returned to Cheltenham on another one-month loan. On 26 February 2009, Montrose joined League Two club Chesterfield for the remainder of the 2008–09 season.

On 25 June 2009, Montrose was signed on a free transfer by Wycombe Wanderers of League One on a two-year contract. Wycombe were relegated to League Two in 2009–10, in which he made 15 appearances. He was released on 11 May 2011 having made 40 appearances and scored four goals in 2010–11, after Wycombe won promotion back to League One by finishing in third place in League Two.

He joined League Two club Gillingham on 1 July 2011, and made a goalscoring debut in the 1–0 win over Cheltenham Town on 6 August 2011. He also scored the winning goal for Gillingham in their 1–0 home win over Oxford United on 22 October 2011, but was sent off in the same match in the 88th minute for a dangerous tackle on Asa Hall.

In January 2013, he joined League Two rivals Oxford on loan until the end of 2012–13. Montrose made his debut in a 2–1 away win at Bradford City on 12 January 2013, before finishing the loan with five appearances for Oxford. Prior to this loan he had made 18 appearances for Gillingham, as they went on to win the League Two title.

Montrose signed for League Two club York City on a two-year contract on 28 June 2013. He made his debut as a 67th-minute substitute for Tom Platt in a 4–0 home defeat to Burnley in the first round of the League Cup on 6 August 2013. He was released by the club in May 2015.

Montrose signed for National League North club Stockport County on 23 July 2015.

On 30 May 2017, Montrose joined newly promoted National League club AFC Fylde on a two-year contract, with the option of a third year.

In July 2020, Montrose joined National League North side Kidderminster Harriers on a one-year deal. His deal was extended by another year at the end of the 2020-21 season, before he was released by Kidderminster following the 2021-22 season.

Career statistics

Honours
Wycombe Wanderers
Football League Two third-place promotion: 2010–11

Gillingham
Football League Two: 2012–13

References

External links

Profile at the AFC Fylde website

1988 births
Living people
Footballers from Manchester
English footballers
Association football midfielders
Manchester City F.C. players
Wigan Athletic F.C. players
Rochdale A.F.C. players
Cheltenham Town F.C. players
Chesterfield F.C. players
Wycombe Wanderers F.C. players
Gillingham F.C. players
Oxford United F.C. players
York City F.C. players
Stockport County F.C. players
AFC Fylde players
Kidderminster Harriers F.C. players
English Football League players
National League (English football) players
Black British sportspeople